Changning County (Burmese:ကောင်းငြိမ်း ) is a county located in Baoshan Prefecture, Yunnan Province, China.

Administrative divisions
Changning County has 9 towns, 1 township and 3 ethnic townships. 
9 towns

1 township
 Gengjia
3 ethnic townships
 Wandian Dai
 Zhujie Yi
 Goujie Yi and Miao

Ethnic groups
The Changning County Gazetteer (1990:637-646) lists the following ethnic groups.

Yi: 16,339 persons (1985)
Lalubo subgroup 腊罗拨: Zhujie District 珠街区
Tulibo subgroup 土俚拨 (Han exonym: Tuzu 土族): Goujie District 耇街区
Dai: 5,179 persons (1985)
Guke 姑柯 (Kasi 卡斯)、Wandian 湾甸、Mengcong 勐统
Miao: 4,033 persons (1985)
Zhujie 珠街、Goujie 耇街、Gengga 更嘎、Mengcong 勐统、Kejie 柯街
Bulang: 1,057 persons (1985); autonyms: Puman 蒲满、Benren 本人
Guban 谷板、Zhongzhai 中寨 of Xingu Township 新谷乡, Western Kasi District 卡斯区西部
Shuanglong 双龙、Yingbaizhai 应百寨、Ergou 二沟 of Kasi Township 卡斯乡
Baicaolin 白草林、Dachushui 大出水 of Ximi Township 西米乡, Gengga District 更嘎区
Bai: 410 persons (1985)
Erdaoqiao 二道桥, Lanshan Township 兰山乡, Kasi District 卡斯区
Hui: 831 persons (1985)
Mengtingzhai 勐廷寨, Mengting Township 勐廷乡, Dabing District 达丙区
Kejie 柯街
Wandian 湾甸

Climate

References

External links
Changning County Official Website
Changning County Tourism Bureau

County-level divisions of Baoshan, Yunnan